George Robson Strachan (29 August 1932 – 9 March 2020) was a Scottish cricketer who played two first-class matches for Scotland in 1965. In domestic cricket matches in Scotland, he took nearly 1,000 wickets and scored 6,000 runs during his career.

References

External links
 

1932 births
2020 deaths
People from Blackridge, West Lothian
Scottish cricketers